Opsahl is a Norwegian surname. Notable people with the name include:

 Arve Opsahl (1921–2007), Norwegian movie and stage actor, singer and stand-up comedian
 Allan Opsahl (1924–1990), American ice hockey defenseman
 Bjørn Opsahl (born 1968), Norwegian photographer, director and lecturer
 Carl Petter Opsahl (born 1964), Norwegian priest, jazz musician and journalist
 Haakon Opsahl (1905–2001), Norwegian and Canadian chess player
 Johan Opsahl (1866–1933), Norwegian politician
 Morten Opsahl (born 1955), Norwegian sprint canoer
 Torkel Opsahl (1931–1993), Norwegian human rights scholar

Norwegian-language surnames